Carlos Burity (14 November 1952 – 12 August 2020) was an Angolan singer. He specialized in Semba music, a traditional Angolan style.

Burity died from respiratory problems on 12 August 2020.

Albums
AngolaRitmo (1990)
Carolina (1992)
Malalanza (2010)

References

1952 births
2020 deaths
20th-century Angolan male singers
People from Luanda